Alaena caissa is a butterfly in the family Lycaenidae. It is found in Uganda and Tanzania. Its habitat consists of open, rocky areas.

Subspecies
Alaena caissa caissa (northern Tanzania)
Alaena caissa kagera Talbot, 1935 (Tanzania: north-west to the Kagera and Bukoba Districts, Uganda: open areas west of Lake Victoria)

References

Butterflies described in 1894
Alaena
Butterflies of Africa